The 1868 United States presidential election in West Virginia took place on November 3, 1868, as part of the 1868 United States presidential election. West Virginia voters chose five representatives, or electors, to the Electoral College, who voted for president and vice president.

 West Virginia was won by Ulysses S. Grant, formerly the 6th Commanding General of the United States Army (R-Illinois), running with Speaker of the House Schuyler Colfax, with 58.83 percent of the popular vote, against the 18th governor of New York, Horatio Seymour (D–New York), running with former Missouri Senator Francis Preston Blair, Jr., with 41.17 percent of the vote.

Results

References 

West Virginia
1868
1868 West Virginia elections